Lal Bihari Yadav is an Indian politician from Samajwadi Party who is the Leader of the Opposition in the Uttar Pradesh Legislative Council, Upper House of Uttar Pradesh Legislature. He succeeded Sanjay Lathar in this position.

References 

Members of the Uttar Pradesh Legislative Council
Politicians from Varanasi
Leaders of the Opposition in the Uttar Pradesh Legislative Council
Year of birth missing (living people)
Living people
Samajwadi Party politicians from Uttar Pradesh